The 1893–94 season was the ninth since the foundation of St. Mary's F.C. based in Southampton in southern England. For the third consecutive year, the club were eliminated in the second qualifying round of the FA Cup; they were also defeated in the final of the Hampshire Senior Cup.

Summary of the season
Having embraced professionalism in the previous season, the club recruited two players from The Football League in the summer of 1893: Jack Angus from Ardwick and Harry Offer, who had previously been with Royal Arsenal. The season started well, with four consecutive victories in friendly matches, including a 9–2 victory over Christchurch (in which Angus scored four) on 22 September and a 7–0 victory over the Royal Engineers two weeks later.

In the FA Cup an easy victory over Uxbridge was followed by defeat at Reading. Two days after the cup defeat, St. Mary's entertained Bolton Wanderers with the Football League side demonstrating their superiority with an emphatic 5–0 victory. This was the only defeat before Christmas.

In the New Year, a series of injuries, including to full-back Ginger Price and captain George Carter, led to a fall off in form. In the Hampshire Senior Cup, the holders Freemantle were defeated at the second attempt in the semi-final (in which Angus was sent off) leading to the final, where St. Mary's lost to a team from the Royal Engineers. In the final, Price's replacement, Rowthorn, suffered serious internal injuries, thus ending his football career. Shortly afterwards, St. Mary's recruited a replacement full-back, when they signed Lachie Thomson from Stoke. Thomson was the first of several players to be recruited from Stoke; he would be joined by six of his former Stoke colleagues by October 1895.

Also injured in the final was long-term goalkeeper Ralph Ruffell whose playing career was ended by a dislocated knee-cap. Ruffell was the sole remaining player from the eleven who had played the club's inaugural match in November 1885.

St. Mary's gained some compensation for their failure in the Hampshire Senior Cup, when they won the Hampshire County Cricket Club Charity Cup. Charles Miller, who was still studying in the town, played in all three matches in this cup; these were his final competitive appearances before returning to his native Brazil, where he introduced football and became known as the "father" of Brazilian football.

During the 1893–94 season, the Saints arranged a match under "Well's Patent" lights, but it was called off due to bad weather; it would be another 60 years before Southampton played their first match under floodlights. At the end of the season, the Saints were able to report a "profit" of over £85 — gate receipts and subscriptions had produced income of £768, with expenses of £683 including wages of £221 and rent for the Antelope Ground of £42.

In June 1894, St. Mary's Church, who owned the freehold of the Antelope Ground, were short of funds and decided that the ground should be sold. They offered it to the Town Council for £5,000 but this was declined. There was a brief half-hearted campaign to persuade the Saints to purchase the freehold, but the club could not afford it but instead considered a permanent move to the County Ground. Ultimately, this all came to nothing and the Saints remained at the Antelope Ground for the start of the next, historic season, when they would play league football for the first time.

FA Cup
As in the two previous seasons, St. Mary's exited the FA Cup in the second qualifying round. After a straightforward victory over Uxbridge in the first qualifying round, the Saints were drawn against Reading who had gone through at the Saints' expense in controversial circumstances two years earlier. The Saints were not able to gain revenge, however, and were defeated 2–1. Reading went on to defeat Swindon Town in the next qualifying round to enter the first round proper for the first time where they visited Preston North End, losing 18–0, with Frank Becton and Jimmy Ross each scoring six goals. This remains Reading's worst-ever defeat.

Results

Legend

Hampshire Senior Cup
Having exited the FA Cup in November, St. Mary's only realistic hope for a significant trophy was in the Hampshire Senior Cup. After defeating Cowes in the first round, they were drawn against the holders, local rivals Freemantle in the semi-final. St. Mary's were looking to gain revenge for their controversial defeat in the 1893 final and the match attracted great interest in the town with the crowd at the County Ground being reported as "larger than for the final the previous year". St. Mary's were without full-back Ginger Price and captain George Carter, both of whom were injured with their places being filled by Rowthorn and "Banquo" Stride respectively.

The first match ended in a 1–1 draw so the teams met again three weeks later. Despite having Jack Angus sent off for an "over zealous" tackle (thus becoming the first St. Mary's player to be dismissed) and Freemantle having a shot hit the crossbar, St. Mary's won the replay 2–1 to set up the final with the Royal Engineers.

With Angus not being able to play, and Carter and Price still injured, the Saints fielded a weakened side in the final. Things got worse when Rowthorn was injured after only five minutes with serious internal injuries which ended his football career. Midway through the second half, the St. Mary's goalkeeper Ralph Ruffell suffered a dislocated kneecap, thus reducing St. Mary's to nine players. In the circumstances, to lose the final by only a single goal was a "creditable" result.

Results

Hampshire County Cricket Club Charity Cup

Results

Portsmouth & District Cup

Results

Friendly matches
In the absence of a local league structure, St. Mary's continued to arrange friendly matches against military sides and club sides from around the country. Three teams from The Football League visited the Antelope Ground: Bolton Wanderers won 5–0 on 23 November and Stoke won 3–2 in the final match of the season, on 25 April 1894. On 13 January, the Saints entertained, and defeated, Woolwich Arsenal for the third consecutive year with Angus and Nineham both scoring twice, with the Gunners only able to score twice in reply. Other large victories included those over Christchurch (9–2), Royal Engineers (7–0) and "Cameronians" (6–1).

In all, St. Mary's played 23 friendlies, with 13 wins, four draws and six defeats.

Player statistics
The players who appeared in any of the four Cup tournaments were as follows. This list does not include players who only played in friendly matches.

Key
 GK — Goalkeeper 
 FB — Full back  
 HB —  Half-back
 FW — Forward

Transfers

In

Departures

References

Bibliography

External links
Southampton's kit designs

 

Southampton F.C. seasons
Southampton